Commander Kraken is a fictional character appearing in American comic books published by Marvel Comics.

Publication history
Commander Kraken first appeared in Sub-Mariner #27 (July 1970), and was created by Roy Thomas and Sal Buscema. The character was later killed by the Scourge of the Underworld in Captain America #319 (July 1986).

Fictional character biography
Commander Kraken was a self-styled modern-day pirate who fought Namor the Sub-Mariner. Namor used the Kraken, a gigantic octopus, to defeat his foe. After a run-in with The Cat, he later reappears with a heavily modified look, undergoing plastic surgery and acquiring a rocket-powered peg leg and an electrified sword.

In issue #121 of Daredevil (which takes place after the character's appearance in The Cat and before his revamped look and appearance in Iron Man), it is revealed that Commander Kraken is the head of HYDRA's naval division. But this is the only time the character is ever mentioned as being associated with that terrorist group. In 2009, Marvel would create a new character simply called Kraken that would be an integral part of Hydra's operations.

Later, Commander Kraken was invited to a meeting organized by Gary Gilbert, who wanted to discuss counter-measures against the threat by the Scourge of the Underworld at the "Bar With No Name". Kraken attended and was shot dead along with all the other criminals present by the Scourge himself, who had infiltrated the meeting as the bartender.

Commander Kraken is among the dead characters seen in Erebus when Hercules travels to the Underworld. Here, he had reverted to his original look from his first appearance. He was later seen as a member of Pluto's jury (alongside Abomination, Armless Tiger Man, Artume, Baron Heinrich Zemo, Iron Monger, Jack O'Lantern, Kyknos, Nessus, Orka, Scourge of the Underworld, and Veranke) at Zeus' trial.

Powers and abilities

Commander Kraken had a hook on his left hand that was capable of emitting an electrical shock, this was later replaced with a functional bionic hand. His left leg was also bionic, and allowed him to fly. His electro-sword was capable of firing electricity and could reflect force and energy attacks.

Commander Kraken originally used huge squid-shaped submarines he called "Squid Ships" for his piratical conquests. When he revamped his look in 1976, his vehicle of choice was a Brigantine called "The Albatross". This old style pirate ship could transform into a sleek golden high powered submarine.

References

External links
 Commander Kraken at Marvel Wiki
 Commander Kraken at Comic Vine

Characters created by Roy Thomas
Characters created by Sal Buscema
Comics characters introduced in 1970
Fictional amputees
Fictional pirates
Fictional swordfighters in comics
Hydra (comics) agents
Marvel Comics male supervillains